Benjamin Charles Apps (1871 – 25 September 1935) was a croquet player from England.

Ben Apps won the Open Championship three times (1926, 1930 and 1931) and the Men's Championship twice (1929 and 1931).

As an administrator, Apps served on the Council of the Croquet Association between 1923 and 1931.

References

External links
The Croquet Records site

1871 births
1935 deaths
English croquet players